The Kharkiv KhAI-5, (sometimes Neman R-10) was a Soviet reconnaissance and light bomber aircraft, designed in the mid-1930s in the Kharkiv Aviation Institute (KhAI, - in Ukrainian: ХАІ), under the direction of Iosif Grigorevich Nyeman (sometimes written as Neman).

Development
The first prototype of the plane, with a factory designation KhAI-5 (ХАІ-5), flew in June 1936. Despite a lower performance, the aircraft won a contest against another reconnaissance plane design, the Kochyerigin R-9, and was accepted for a production with the military designation R-10 ('R' indicated razvyedchik meaning reconnaissance in Russian). It was a modern design for the time. 493 R-10s were manufactured in the Kharkiv and Saratov aviation plants by early 1940. The first series showed some teething problems, which resulted in Iosif Nyeman being arrested by the NKVD on December 11, 1938 under the accusation of sabotage and espionage, a common accusation at the time.

In 1938, the KhAI-52 ground attack aircraft, based on the R-10, was also developed. It was powered by a Shvetsov M-63  radial engine and armed with seven machine guns and  bombs. A production run of an experimental series of 10 aircraft was prepared, but it was cancelled with Nyeman's arrest.

Some production R-10s were fitted with more powerful Tumansky M-88, Shvetsov M-62 and M-63 engines. Over 60 aircraft, withdrawn from the Air Force, were used from 1940 as mail carriers by Aeroflot, under the designation PS-5 (Russian: ПС-5), with 3 passenger seats.

Combat use
The aircraft entered service in the Soviet Air Force in 1937, replacing some Polikarpov R-5s. R-10s were first used in combat in the 1939 Soviet-Japanese Battle of Khalkhin Gol. Then, they were used in the initial stage of World War II, starting with use in the invasion of Poland (without combat encounters) and against Finland in the Winter War (1939–1940). R-10s were next used in the first period of the German-Soviet war, following the German attack on June 22, 1941. By this time, they were outdated and suffered heavy losses, as did the rest of the Soviet Air Force. Many planes were destroyed on the ground. They were used as tactical reconnaissance aircraft, and, in need, also as light bombers. Later many were used as night bombers, to reduce losses from opposing fighters. The remaining R-10s were withdrawn from combat service in 1943 although two Finnish pilots claimed R-10s in 1944.

Description
The aircraft was conventional in layout, with a low mounted, plywood-covered wooden cantilever wing. The fuselage was of semi-monocoque construction. The undercarriage retracted into the wings. The crew consisted a pilot and an observer/rear gunner in a turret with a single machine gun. In the observer compartment's floor there was an AFA-13 camera for reconnaissance duties. Between the crew compartments there were fuel tanks and a vertical bomb bay. The plane was powered by various variants of the Shvetsov M-25 and related M-63 radial engines, a development of the Wright R-1820 built under licence, which spun an all-metal two-bladed Hamilton Standard variable-pitch propeller.

Operators

Soviet Air Force
Aeroflot

Variants
 KhAI-5bis - Improved R-10/KhAI-5, one example flown early 1939.
 KhAI-51 alternative designation for KhAI-5bis
 KhAI-52 - Production version of KhAI-51. Ten ordered but production cancelled.
 R-10 - Production version of KhAI-5

Specifications

See also

References

External links 

1930s Soviet bomber aircraft
1930s Soviet military reconnaissance aircraft
World War II Soviet medium bombers
World War II Soviet reconnaissance aircraft
Kharkiv Aviation Institute aircraft
Single-engined tractor aircraft
Aircraft first flown in 1936